Alex Ruan Vasconcelos Ferreira or simply Alex Ruan (born February 5, 1993 in Belém), is a Brazilian footballer who plays as a left back for Brusque.

Honours

Remo
Campeonato Paraense: 2014, 2015

ABC
Campeonato Potiguar: 2016

Cuiabá
Copa Verde: 2019

References

External links
 
 Alex Ruan at playmakerstats.com (English version of ogol.com.br)

1993 births
Living people
Brazilian footballers
Clube do Remo players
ABC Futebol Clube players
Joinville Esporte Clube players
Grêmio Esportivo Brasil players
Mirassol Futebol Clube players
Cuiabá Esporte Clube players
Brusque Futebol Clube players
Association football defenders
Sportspeople from Belém